Foreman Glacier is a glacier flowing south-southeast from the Havre Mountains in the northern portion of Alexander Island, Antarctica. The glacier was surveyed by the British Antarctic Survey (BAS), 1975–76, and was named by the UK Antarctic Place-Names Committee in 1980 after David Alexander Foreman, a BAS aircraft mechanic at Adelaide Station, 1973–76.

See also

 Hushen Glacier
 Mikado Glacier
 Transition Glacier

References 

Glaciers of Alexander Island